Coalition of Associations of Senior Citizens in the Philippines, Inc., commonly known as Senior Citizens Partylist, is a political party in the Philippines representing the interests of the elderly, otherwise known as "senior citizens" in the Philippines and the United States, and as "pensioners" elsewhere. It has run and won seats in the party-list elections. It has been plagued by party infighting, which has led to delay in its nominees taking their seats in the House of Representatives.

History

2007 
Senior Citizens Partylist initially did not win a seat in 2007. However, due to the 2009 BANAT vs. COMELEC decision of the Supreme Court, they were awarded one seat.

2010
The party finished second in the national party-list vote, winning two seats in the House of Representatives. After its two nominees were seated, one of them, David Kho, offered to resign to let the 4th nominee, Remedios Arquiza, take his seat. The Commission on Elections, prohibiting term-sharing unless a nominee dies, disallowed it.

In the 15th Congress, the party was able to pass the law requiring that senior citizens have their own polling precincts.

2013
In the 2013 election, the party was disqualified by the Commission on Elections, after the Supreme Court ruled that the party-list election no longer be restricted to marginalized groups. The party was still included in the ballot, as they were disqualified after the ballots were printed. The party finished with more than 2% of the vote, and would have won seats if it was not disqualified. The Supreme Court later ordered the commission to proclaim the party winners in the election. The commission was not able to proclaim the party as winners, however, since there were two sets of lists of nominees submitted by the party. One list had Godofredo Arquiza and Milagros Magsaysay as its top two nominees, while the other had Francisco Datol Jr. and Amelia Olegario. By 2014, the party sought relief from the Supreme Court as they still were not able to take their seats. The commission offered a compromise whereby Arquiza and Datol were to be seated, but both nominees refused.

By the time the 2016 election were held, no nominees from the party had been seated in the 16th Congress.

2016
For the 2016 election, with the backing of the commission, Datol and Magsaysay agreed to become the 1st and 2nd nominees, respectively. Arquiza established his own "Coalition of Seniors and the Elderly" party. The party ran, won, and was proclaimed winner of two seats in the 2016 election. Datol and Magsaysay were seated in the 17th Congress.

2019
For the May 2019 election, the party submitted three lists of nominees, with each list headed by one of the faction heads, Datol, Magsaysay, and Arquiza. Arquiza argued that his set of nominees was legal, as he was the #1 nominee since 2007. The party had a stalemate for their 1 seat in Congress. On July 22, Congress convened for the first time. By late November, after the 18th Congress had convened, its leaders asked the Commission on Elections to release the Certificates of Proclamations to Senior Citizens and Duterte Youth. Both parties had unresolved internal disputes, with Senior Citizens still unable to declare their first nominee. By December 4, over five months since Congress first convened, Majority Leader Martin Romualdez announced that they had received a Certificate of Proclamation for Datol, who was sworn in on the same day.

On August 10, 2020, Datol died due to complications from COVID-19. Rodolfo Ordanes replaced him on October 13, 2020.

Electoral performance

Representatives to Congress

Notes

References

Pensioners' parties
Party-lists represented in the House of Representatives of the Philippines
2003 establishments in the Philippines